Soki ( sooki) is a specialty of the cuisine of Okinawa Prefecture, Japan. Soki are (usually boneless) stewed pork spare ribs, with the cartilage still attached. They are often served with Okinawa soba (called suba).

Dishes

Soki soba
Okinawa soba with stewed soki on top. The soki are prepared by first boiling to remove excess fat, then stewing in a mixture of awamori (to soften the meat), soy sauce, and sugar for three to four hours. They are then placed in a bowl of Okinawa soba.

Soki jiru
Soup containing soki, konbu (edible seaweed), and daikon (Japanese radish), with salt and soy sauce for flavoring. The soki are first boiled to remove excess fat and drippings, then stewed in the soup until tender.

In mainland Japan, konbu is usually used just for flavoring and then discarded, but a distinctive feature of Okinawan soups is that the konbu is left in.

References 

Okinawan cuisine